Giovanni Domenico d'Ettore (1550–1605) was a Roman Catholic prelate who served as Bishop of Ostuni (1604–1605).

Biography
Giovanni Domenico d'Ettore was born in Reggiano, Italy in 1550. During 1570s he collaborated with Carlo Borromeo. On 28 January 1604, he was appointed Bishop of Ostuni by Pope Clement VIII. On 8 February 1604, he was consecrated bishop by Girolamo Bernerio, Cardinal-Bishop of Albano. He served as Bishop of Ostuni until his death in October 1605.

References 

17th-century Italian Roman Catholic bishops
Bishops appointed by Pope Clement VIII
1554 births
1606 deaths